Rik de Voest and Łukasz Kubot were the defending champions; however, they chose to not participate this year.
Twins brothers Sanchai Ratiwatana and Sonchat Ratiwatana defeated 6–4, 6–2 Tasuku Iwami and Toshihide Matsui in the final.

Seeds

Draw

Draw

References
 Doubles Draw
 Qualifying Draw

Busan Open Challenger Tennis - Doubles
2009 Doubles